The following is a timeline of the history of the city of Oran, Algeria.

Prior to 19th century

 903 CE – Ouahran founded by Andalusian Umayyad traders (traditional date).
 13th century – Zayyanids in power.
 1492 – Andalusian refugees flee to Oran (approximate date).
 1509 – Spanish conquest.
 1556 – Siege of Oran (1556) by Ottoman forces.
 1563 – Sieges of Oran and Mers El Kébir by Ottoman forces.
 1604 – Fort Santa Cruz built.
 1669 – Jews expelled.
 1708 – Algiers recaptures Oran.
 1732 – Spanish reconquest.
 1738 – Population: 9,000.
 1785 – Population: 12,000.
 1790 – October 9: 1790 Oran earthquake.
 1791 – Algiers retakes Oran.
 1792 –  (mosque) built.
 1794 – Plague outbreak.
 1796 – Hassan Pasha Mosque built.

19th century
 1831 – Pujol appointed mayor of Oran.
 1834 – Treaty of Desmichel with the governor of French Algeria and Emir Abdelkader in Oran in secret from France who denied the treaty later.
 1836 – General Létang transforms the glacis Castle-Nine into a walk which bears its name.
 1837 – General Bugeaud arrived in Oran to negotiate a new treaty (The Treaty of Tafna, May 20) with Emir Abd El-Kader. On November 14 the Emir signed a treaty with Desmichel recognizing its [whose?] authority to the west of Algiers except for Oran, Mostaganem and Arzew.
 1845 – General Lamoricière constructed the "Village Nègre." 
 1847 – Following a severe drought lasting several months, a terrible epidemic of cholera strikes, decimating the population of Oran. 
 1847 - January 1: 47,300 French people had come from Alsace, the Vosges, Dauphiné and the south of France at the same time as 31,000 Spaniards, 8,800 Maltese, 8,200 Italians and 8,600 Swiss and Germans who were believed to be the worst settlers.
 1848
 Algiers-Oran railway begins operating.
 Oran becomes the prefecture of the administrative department of the same name. 
 Creation of the small Basin of the Old Port (four hectares).
 A civil hospital is built.
 1849 – Cholera outbreak.
 1850 –  (church) construction begins atop .
 1851 - 30,258 inhabitants in Oran.
 1858 – December 5: The members of the first general council of Oran, named by Emperor Napoleon III, meet with the prefecture, with Jules de Pre de Saint-Maur as chairman.
 1862 – Slaughterhouse built.
 1865 - Napoleon III grants French nationality to Jews and Muslims. This decree was very frowned upon by the settlers and it was not until October 24, 1870 that the Crémieux decree actually allowed 37,000 Jews from Algeria to become citizens of France.
 1866 – Roman Catholic Diocese of Oran established.
 1876 - 45,640 inhabitants in Oran.
 1877 – University Hospital of Oran construction begins.
 1878 – Société de Géographie et d’Archéologie d’Oran founded.
 1880
 Great Synagogue of Oran built.
 Oran builds a great extension starting from the place d'Armes. The ravine of l'Oued Rouina is filled.
 1881 – Horse-drawn tram begins operating.
 1885 – Municipal Museum of Oran and Demaeght established. 63,929 inhabitants in Oran.
 1886 –  (city hall) built.
 1899 – Electric tram begins operating.
 1900 – Population: 93,000.

20th century

1900s–1940s

 1906 - Population: 101,009 inhabitants.
 1907 – Construction of the theatre.
 1909 – December 14: the first flight in Oran is carried out by Julien Serviès on a Sommer monoplane at Sénia,. Next 9 January, a great meeting gathers forty thousand people, also in Sénia, in the presence of Marshal Lyautey.
 1911 - Population: 118,023 inhabitants.
 1912 – Population: 123,086.
 1913 – Cathedral Sacré Coeur built.
 1921 - Population: 138,212 inhabitants.
 1926 - Population: 145,183 inhabitants.
 1928 – Oran socialiste newspaper begins publication.
 1930 – Creation of new districts, less dense and more luxurious: these included higher Gambetta, Bon Reception, the Beavers, Médioni, Small Boulanger, Cité... This development continues overall with the creation of districts even more sumptuous, overflowing the first crown (district of Saint-Hubert, Palm trees, Point of the Day, Gambetta...)
 1930–32 – Sénia, the Oran aérodrome, is where several world records of duration and distance in closed loop are established.
 1931 - Population: 187,981.
 1936 - Population: 217,819 inhabitants in Oran. On August 1, 1936, the French designer and couturier Yves Saint Laurent was born in Oran.
 1936 - The number of Moroccans in the department of Oran is 19,902, of which 4,395 lived in the city of Oran.
 1940
 Beginning of the construction of the new prefecture.
 July 3: following the German invasion of Paris and fall of France, the British fleet attacked from Gibraltar, damaging the French fleet of the Atlantic based at Mers el Kébir. Its bombardment sank three battleships: Dunkerque, Provence and Bretagne. Twelve hundred French sailors died as a result. The British feared that the French fleet could be taken over and used against them. The Vichy government operated in Algeria.
 1942 – November 8: as prelude to the invasion of Italy, the British and the Americans land at Arzew, and Oran capitulates on November 10.
 1946 – MC Oran football club formed.
 1947 – Camus' fictional novel The Plague published.
 1948 – Population: 244,594.
 1949 – OS attack post office.

1950s–1990s

 1950 – Oran has 256,661 inhabitants. Sixty-five percent of the Europeans were of Spanish origin, and they outnumbered the Algerian Muslims in the city.
 1951 – Dairy built.
 1955 – Trefle Apartments (hi-rise) built.
 1957 – Parc Municipal des Sports (stadium) opens.
 1958 – June 6: French president de Gaulle visits city.
 1960
 Resistance fighters put up their first barricades.
 Palais des Sports Hamou Boutlélis (arena) opens.
 1961
 August: appearance of the Organisation armée secrète.
 The census states the population of Oran 400,000 inhabitants: 220,000 Europeans (including many born in Algeria) and 180,000 Algerian Muslims.
 1962
 25 March: Edmond Jouhaud, a chief of the Organisation armée secrète, arrested. 
 5 July: City becomes part of independent Algeria.
 5–7 July: Massacre of Europeans occurs. Most survivors of French ancestry left the city, fleeing to France.
 1965 – University of Oran established.
 1966 – Population: 327,493.
 1975 – Abdallah Ibn Salam Mosque established.
 1977 – Population: 490,788 city; 543,485 urban agglomeration.
 1985 – Raï music festival held.
 1988 – 1988 October Riots.
 1992 – National Centre of Research in Social and Cultural Anthropology headquartered in Oran.
 1994
 Le Quotidien d'Oran newspaper begins publication.
 12 administrative urban areas created: El-Badr, Bouamama, El-Emir, El-Hamri, El-Makkari, El-Menzeh, Muhieddine, El-Othmania, Es-Saada, and Es-Seddikia.
 1998 – Population: 705,335.

21st century

 2007 – Sonatrach HQ building constructed.
 2008
 Bahia Center (hi-rise) built.(fr)
 Population: 1,165,687.
 2013 – Oran Tramway begins operating.
 2014 – Renault car manufactory begins operating.
 2017 – 6 additional administrative urban areas created: Akid Lotfi, Ed-Derb, Fellaoucène, Hammou Boutlélis, El-Khaldia, and Mahieddine.
 2021 – 2021 Mediterranean Games to be held in Oran.

See also
 Oran history
 
 List of governors of Oran, 1509–1831 (Spanish and Ottoman periods)
 List of mayors of Oran, 1832–present (includes French period)
 
 Timelines of other cities in Algeria: Algiers
 Years in Algeria

References

This article incorporates information from the French Wikipedia and Spanish Wikipedia.

Bibliography

in English
 
 
 
 
 
Joshua Schreier. The Merchants of Oran: A Jewish Port at the Dawn of Empire. Stanford Studies in Jewish History and Culture Series.; Stanford Stanford University Press, 2017. 216 pp. ,.

in French
 
  (+ table of contents)
 
 
 
  
  
  
 Bibliography

External links

   (Bibliography of open access  articles)
  (Bibliography)
  (Images, etc.)
  (Images, etc.)
  (Images, etc.)
  (Bibliography)
  (Bibliography)
  (Bibliography)

Oran
Oran
oran
Years in Algeria